Adamovec is a small town in central Croatia, north of Sesvete and southwest of Sveti Ivan Zelina. It is formally a settlement (naselje) of Zagreb, the capital of Croatia. According to the 2001 census, Adamovec counts 984 inhabitants.

References

Populated places in the City of Zagreb